The School of Economics at the University of Edinburgh is a division of the University's College of Humanities and Social Science in Edinburgh. While comprising a small school, the subject economics at the University has a long history. The first lessons in economics were delivered by Dugald Stewart in 1800, while William Ballantyne Hodgson was appointed as the first actual economics professor in 1871. The subject's development progressed slowly until the subject became a major, then department and finally a separate school.

Having initially been titled the Department of Economics under the auspices of the University of Edinburgh's Faculty of Social Sciences, the school was moved to a department of the University of Edinburgh Business School, then known as the University of Edinburgh Management School, in 2002. In 2009, the school was renamed as the School of Economics, operating independently under the College of Humanities and Social Science's umbrella.

Faculty
Alexander Gray, chair, 1935-1956.
John Hardman Moore, 2001–present.
Frederick Ogilvie, chair, 1926-1935.
Alan T. Peacock, chair, 1956-1962.
Yongcheol Shin, lecturer, 1998-2000.

References

External links

UoEdinburgh Economics Blog

Economics schools
Schools of the University of Edinburgh